Alexis Brunelle-Duceppe  (born July 1, 1979) is a Canadian politician, who was elected to the House of Commons of Canada in the 2019 election. He represents the electoral district of Lac-Saint-Jean as a member of the Bloc Québécois.

He is the son of former party leader Gilles Duceppe.

Electoral record

References

External links

Bloc Québécois MPs
Living people
Members of the House of Commons of Canada from Quebec
People from Alma, Quebec
21st-century Canadian politicians
1979 births